Raimund Hedl (born August 31, 1974) is an Austrian former football goalkeeper. He is a current goalkeeping coach of the Rapid Wien.

Personal life
Hedl's sons, Niklas and Tobias, are professional footballers at Rapid Wien.

Honours
Austrian Football Bundesliga (1):
 2008

References

External links
 Player profile - SK Rapid
 Player stats - Rapid Archive
 guardian football

1974 births
Living people
Footballers from Vienna
Austrian footballers
LASK players
SK Rapid Wien players
SV Mattersburg players
Austrian Football Bundesliga players
Association football goalkeepers